V4332 Sagittarii is a nova-like event in the constellation of Sagittarius. It was discovered February 24, 1994 at an apparent visual magnitude of 8.9 by Japanese amateur astronomer Minoru Yamamoto from Okazaki, Aichi, then confirmed by K. Hirosawa. Initially designated Nova Sagittarii 1994 #1, it was given the variable star designation V4332 Sgr. A spectra of the event taken March 4 lacked the characteristic features of a classical nova, with the only emission lines being of the Balmer series. Subsequent spectra showed a rapid decline in luminosity and a change of spectral type over a period of five days. By 2003, the object was ~1500 times less luminous than at peak magnitude and showed a spectrum of an M-type star.

The nova-like event V838 Mon and this outburst formed an unusual category of erupting stars. In 2003, N. Soker and R. Tylenda proposed an accretion scenario as an explanation. They noted that a merger of two main sequence stars in a close binary orbit could explain the observed properties, a process now known as a luminous red nova. In this scenario, the decline in brightness and radius of V4332 Sgr was a consequence of the merged stellar envelope undergoing gravitational contraction.

An infrared excess from the object suggests it has a circumstellar disk. The infrared spectrum of this feature showed an absorption band of water ice and a carbon monoxide emission band. By 2010, the stellar component had become concealed by a dusty disk viewed edge-on. This dust includes a significant component of alumina, with growing amounts of magnesia and iron oxide.

See also
V1309 Scorpii

References

Further reading

Luminous red novae
Sagittarius (constellation)
Sagittarii, V4332